The Oktyabrskiy Big Concert Hall (BKZ) (Big Concert Hall "October") is a theatre located in Saint Petersburg, Russia. It hosts variety actors, rock musicians, and also dance and ballet collectives. Located in the Greek Square, it opened October 1967, inaugurated 50 years after the October Revolution.

The director of the hall, since 1988, has been Emma Lavrinovich.

History 
The venue was built on the grounds of a former Greek Orthodox church (formerly known as the Greek Square). This is reflected in Joseph Brodsky's poem A Stop in a Desert.

The construction took place between 1961 and 1967, by a group headed by Aleksandr Zhuk. The project involved architects Valentin Kamensky and Jean Verzhbitsky, and the engineers Galkin and Maksimov. The building silhouette is strictly geometrical, the facade is decorated with a huge stained-glass window. Over the front entrance, there is a bronze frieze by sculptor Mikhail Anikushin.

In 2007, the concert hall underwent necessary repairs. The works covered all systems of the building, taking place from July until October 2009.

Noted performers 

A-ha
Aleksandr Panayotov
Cesária Évora
Charles Aznavour
Cliff Richard
Dean Reed
Duke Ellington
Elena Vaenga
Elton John
Emin Agalarov
James Blunt
José Carreras
Joseph Kobzon
Julio Iglesias
Klavdiya Shulzhenko
Leonid Utyosov
Lyube
Lyudmila Zykina
Мельница
Mireille Mathieu
Mstislav Rostropovich
Nadezhda Kadysheva
Patricia Kaas
Salvatore Adamo
Sviatoslav Richter
Valery Leontiev

Notes 
1."Grand", "Large", "Big" and "Great" are all accepted translations of «Большой». However, "big" is most commonly used within the media in reference to the concert hall.

References

External links

 

Music venues in Russia
Entertainment in Saint Petersburg
Theatres in Saint Petersburg 
Buildings and structures in Saint Petersburg
1967 establishments in Russia